The M34 is a short metropolitan route in Johannesburg, South Africa.

Route 
The M34 begins at the M17 and ends at the M31.

References 

Streets and roads of Johannesburg
Metropolitan routes in Johannesburg